Parechelus is an extinct genus of prehistoric bony fish that lived during the Ypresian (lower Eocene). The genus was circumscribed by Edgard Casier in 1967 for his description of P. parechelus.

When Casier circumscribed this genus, he simultaneously circumscribed the family Parechelidae which had Parechelus as its sole genus; he placed it in the order Anguilliformes. The family Parechelidae was supposedly intermediate between Ophichthidae and Muraenidae. Jack Sepkoski, citing Colin Patterson, also classified the genus in Anguilliformes.

See also

 Prehistoric fish
 List of prehistoric bony fish

References

External links
 
 

Eocene fish
Prehistoric bony fish genera
Prehistoric vertebrates of Oceania